King of Kings is Don Omar's second studio album. It was released on May 23, 2006, three years after his debut studio album The Last Don. Produced by Eliel, the album spent 11 weeks at the top of Billboard Top Latin Albums in 2006. With claimed sales of more than 4.1 million copies it is Don Omar's best selling album and the best selling reggaeton album of all time. To promote the album Omar embarked the King of Kings World Tour. The album also features guest appearances by Miri Ben-Ari, Juelz Santana, Mackie Ranks, Beenie Man and Zion.

The album won the Latin Music Award for Reggaeton Album of the Year at the 2007 Latin Billboard Music Awards and was nominated for Best Urban Music Album at the 2006 Latin Grammy Awards.

Commercial performance 
King of Kings debuted in its first week at #7 on the Billboard 200, and #1 on Top Latin Albums, and Latin Rhythm Album Charts. The album peaked on the Billboard 200 at #7, the highest rank in reggaeton history. First week sales prediction in the United States were between 45,000 and 50,000. the album sold 68,000 copies in the United States in the first week, a record at the time as the biggest first-week sales of a Reggaeton album. In Just Four Weeks, the album cross the 160,000 units. The album spent 11 weeks at the peak of Billboard Top Latin Albums in Billboard, the album sold in United States was certified  500,000 Gold, 240,000 Platinum  by Recording Industry Association of America in 2007,  the album has moved 500,000 sales in 2010,  the album sold over 556,000 copies in the United States and was certified Gold by the RIAA. It ended up at No. 8 in the Best of the 2000s on the Latin album chart.

The song «Cuentale» by the album King of Kings was top 17 Tropical Airplay on by Billboard.

The single «Te Quiero Pa Mi» by the album King of Kings 10th anniversary (Remastered) was certified Gold by RIAA and was peak 1 Latin Rhythm Airplay, also was top 12 Hot Latin Songs on by Billboard.

The single «Adiós» by the album King of Kings Armaggedón Edition (Reissue) was top 23 Latin Rhythm Airplay on by Billboard.

The song «Ayer La Vi» by the album King of Kings Armaggedón Edition (Reissue) was top 8 in Hot Latin Songs, also was top 6 Tropical Airplay on by Billboard.

The album was presented in United States on Orlando in Center Disney World Music, most 500  admirers they were waiting artist,  i supass the record's sales of the artist Britney Spears at Disney World Music Store Virgin.

The  album was a commercial success across Latin America and Europe. In Spain, the album peaked at number 2 and sold over 50,000 copies. With claimed worldwide sales between 4.1 million and 6 million copies, it is Don Omar's best selling album and the best selling reggaeton album of all time, also was his most successful album by Billboard.

Don Omar made one performance Billboard Latin Music Awards for the album King of Kings with the single Salió el Sol in 2007, was recognized for the by Billboard as one the Best performance the Billboard.

Releases 
The album was released in Japan on September 20, 2006, with two extra tracks, "Cayo El Sol - Tigerstyle Remix" and "La Copa".  A special edition known as King of Kings Armageddon Edition was released on December 19, 2006. It include a second disc with 4 extra songs and a DVD of 4 with music videos. A remastered version King of Kings 10th Anniversary (Remastered) was released on November 11, 2016.

Track listing

 Armageddon Edition 
Track #1–18 from standard edition, and includes a second disc and DVD. The song "Conteo" from track 4 does not feature Juelz Santana for this edition.

Charts

Weekly charts

Year-end charts

Yearly Charts

Sales and certifications

See also
List of number-one Billboard Latin Rhythm Albums of 2007

References

2006 albums
Don Omar albums
Machete Music albums
Albums produced by Luny Tunes
Albums produced by Nely